The 1939 Volta a Catalunya was the 19th edition of the Volta a Catalunya cycle race and was held from 17 September to 24 September 1939. The race started and finished in Barcelona. The race was won by Mariano Cañardo.

Route and stages

General classification

References

1939
Volta
1939 in Spanish road cycling
September 1939 sports events